Jacksonville State University (JSU) is a public university in Jacksonville, Alabama. Founded in 1883, Jacksonville State offers programs of study in six academic schools leading to bachelor's, master's, education specialist, and doctorate degrees in addition to certificate programs and continuing education opportunities. In the Fall semester of 2011, JSU began offering the school's first doctoral degree, Doctor of Science in Emergency Management. In 2016, the university gained approval to offer its second doctorate, a Doctor of Nursing Practice (DNP) degree.

The university was founded as Jacksonville State Normal School, and in 1930, the name changed to Jacksonville State Teachers College, and again in 1957, to Jacksonville State College. The university began operating as Jacksonville State University in 1966.

JSU currently has an enrollment of more than 9,000 students, with nearly 500 faculty members (more than 320 of whom are full-time). Jacksonville State's Business School was ranked within the nation's 90th percentile by the Princeton Review. It is accredited by the Southern Association of Colleges and Schools (SACS). In addition, 40 academic programs (79% of programs that can be accredited) earned specialized programmatic accreditations. These programs include business, education, applied engineering, nursing, social work, drama, art, music, computer science, family and consumer science, and communication.

History
Established in 1883, Jacksonville State Normal School took over the campus of Calhoun College. James G. Ryals Jr. was its first president. When he died, faculty member Joseph Harris Chappell held the presidency for a year before departing for Milledgeville, Georgia where he served as the first president of a new normal school that eventually became Georgia College & State University.

Administration and organization 
Jacksonville State is administered by President Don Killlingsworth  and the Jacksonville State Board of Trustees. Members of the board are appointed by the Governor of Alabama to set the policies of the university and select senior management personnel. Under the doctrine of collective responsibility, the entire board is liable for the financial and other consequences of the organization's activities. The President oversees his or her Presidential Cabinet, composed of the university's vice presidents and other senior personnel. The university's organization chart is available online.

Academic organization

Through Jacksonville State's six academic colleges, the university offers career-centered programs where students can prepare for the workforce.
 College of Arts and Humanities
 College of Business and Industry
 College of Education and Professional Studies
 College of Health Professions and Wellness
 College of Science and Mathematics
 College of Social and Behavioral Sciences
Additionally, students are supported throughout their studies by the following units:
 Student Success
 Online@JSU
 Graduate Studies
 Continuing Education
 Houston Cole Library
 International House and Programs
 Honors Program

Main and satellite campuses

Main campus
The JSU main campus has a  campus with 59 buildings in the Appalachian foothills of northeast Alabama. With this campus being the flagship campus for Jacksonville State, it offers large educational facilities, university housing and residence, on-campus dining, student centers, Greek housing, athletic facilities, student health and wellness facilities, administration offices, study centers, an international housing program, and an on-campus bookstore. The majority of students who study at Jacksonville State attend courses here.

Little River Canyon Center campus
The Little River Canyon Center campus opened to the public in 2009, and is a Jacksonville State University building located in Fort Payne, Alabama that adjoins the Little River Canyon National Preserve. A portion is leased to the National Park Service and the staff of the Little River Canyon National Preserve with a facility that features a Grand Hall, HD movie theater, gift shop, natural history library, exhibits, classrooms, back deck, outdoor amphitheater and trails for both education and adventure.

McClellan campus
The Jacksonville State University Higher Education Consortium was established in 2003, and it houses two state schools: Jacksonville State University–McClellan Center, and Gadsden State Community College–McClellan Campus. Since 2005, the McClellan Center Building 3181 has been home to the Institute of Emergency Preparedness, In-Service, and the Northeast Alabama Police Academy. GSCC houses the traditional college students. Their EMS and 911 programs, in addition to the core classes of English, math, etc., are also housed in the building.

Enrollment 
In the fall of 2010 enrollment peaked at 9,504 students throughout the system, but this number fell slightly because the number of incoming freshman could not keep up with the number of graduating seniors. The Fall 2019 enrollment surpassed 9,000 students for the first time since 2012, with 9,021 undergraduate and graduate students.

Campus events

On January 1, 2012, the university's marching band and dance team, The Southerners and the Marching Ballerinas, led the New Year's Day Parade in London, England, which also kicked off the year-long celebration of both Her Majesty Queen Elizabeth II's Diamond Jubilee and the 2012 London Summer Olympics. The invitation to lead the parade came in September 2010, just as the Southerners learned that they had been awarded the nationally recognized George Washington Honor Medal for their patriotic 2009 show, "Of Thee I Sing."

In 2007, the university broke ground for the  Little River Canyon Center. The building houses National Park Service offices, an exhibit hall, meeting space, classrooms, and comfort stations and is the site of the JSU Little River Canyon Field School, which sponsors dozens of activities, seminars and programs each year. In 1992, the canyon was designated a national preserve. During the summer months, the staff includes 15 park rangers.

In February 2006, Jacksonville State University was named the "winner" of the Foundation for Individual Rights in Education (FIRE) Speech Code of the Month. At the time, FIRE called the University Code of Conduct "illegally overbroad." They considered the code to be in violation of the First Amendment of the Constitution which protects offensive speech. The policy has since been changed.

In 2001, placekicker Ashley Martin became the first woman to score in an NCAA football game, kicking three extra points in the Gamecocks' 72–10 victory over Cumberland University.

Athletics

Jacksonville State's athletics teams are nicknamed the Gamecocks. Through the 2020–21 school year, JSU is a member of the Ohio Valley Conference in Division I FCS (Football Championship Subdivision) in football, formerly I-AA, of the NCAA. The university's football team gained national attention in 2001 when junior (3rd-year) placekicker Ashley Martin became the first female football player to score a point in a Division I game tallying 3 points against Cumberland University.

On July 1, 2021, JSU will move to the ASUN Conference, a league in which it had been a member from 1995 to 2003. The ASUN does not currently sponsor football, but has announced plans to launch a football league in the near future. Until that time, JSU will be a de facto associate member of the Western Athletic Conference, competing in a football partnership between the two leagues officially branded as the ASUN–WAC Challenge.

The school fields varsity teams in 14 sports: baseball, men's and women's basketball, cross country, football, men's and women's golf, rifle, women's soccer, softball, men's and women's tennis, women's track and field, and volleyball. The football team plays in 25,000-seat Burgess-Snow Field. The men's and women's basketball and volleyball teams play in Pete Mathews Coliseum. Prior to the 1993–94 academic year, Jacksonville State competed in NCAA Division II athletics, winning national championships in men's basketball (1985), baseball (1990 and 1991), football (1992) and gymnastics (1984 and 1985).

Teams 
Jacksonville State University sponsors one co-ed, six men's, and ten women's teams in NCAA sanctioned sports:

Men's Teams
 Baseball
 Basketball
 Cross Country
 Football
 Golf
 Tennis

Women's Teams
 Basketball
 Beach volleyball
 Bowling
 Cross Country
 Golf
 Soccer
 Softball
 Tennis
 Track & Field (Indoor & Outdoor)
 Volleyball

Co-ed Teams
 Rifle *

Football

The Jacksonville State Gamecocks football program is the intercollegiate American football team for Jacksonville State University. The team competes in the NCAA Division I Football Championship Subdivision (FCS) as a member of the ASUN Conference through the 2022-23 school year. The Gamecocks will move to Conference USA in 2023. Jacksonville State's first football team was fielded in 1904, nicknamed at the time as the "Eagle Owls." The team plays its home games at the 24,000 seat Burgess-Snow Field at JSU Stadium in Jacksonville, Alabama. The Gamecocks hire former Division I football coach Rich "RichRod" Rodriguez for the 2022 season.  Rodriguez was previously head coach at football power Michigan (2008-10), as well as West Virginia (2001-07) and Arizona (2012-17).  His luster has dulled in recent years, and he seeks his return to the head coaching circle here at Jax State.  He comes from Louisiana Monroe, where he served as the offensive coordinator under head coach Terry Bowden. "RichRod" replaces former Gamecocks head coach John Grass, who resigned after the 2021 season.  Glass had a 72-26 record during his tenure as head coach which included 6 Ohio Valley Conference championships. In 2021, the Gamecocks upset the Florida State Seminoles in Tallahassee, Florida on a 59-yard touchdown pass at the end of the game.

Baseball

The Jacksonville State Gamecocks baseball team is a varsity intercollegiate athletic team of Jacksonville State University. The team is a member of the Ohio Valley Conference, which is part of the National Collegiate Athletic Association's Division I. The team plays its home games at Rudy Abbott Field in Jacksonville, Alabama. The Gamecocks are coached by Jim Case. During the 2013–2014 campaign, the Gamecocks won the OVC championship and received an automatic bid for the annual NCAA regional tournament.

Basketball

The Jacksonville State Gamecocks men's basketball team is the men's basketball team that represents Jacksonville State University. The school's team currently competes in the Ohio Valley Conference. During the 2016–2017 season, the Gamecocks won the OVC championship and received their first NCAA tournament bid under the direction of head coach, Ray Harper.

Women's basketball

The Jacksonville State Gamecocks women's basketball team is the women's basketball team that represents Jacksonville State University. The team currently competes in the Ohio Valley Conference. The Gamecocks are coached by Rick Pietri.

Softball

The Jacksonville State Gamecocks softball team represents Jacksonville State University in NCAA Division I college softball. The team participates in the Ohio Valley Conference (OVC). The Gamecocks are currently led by head coach Jana McGinnis. The team plays its home games at University Field located on the university's campus.

The Marching Southerners

Jacksonville State University's marching band, The Marching Southerners, was founded in 1956 by John Finley. He also conceived the band's precision dance line, The Marching Ballerinas. Dr. David L. Walters, for whom JSU's music department is named, served as band director from 1961 to 1991 and is credited with bringing the Marching Southerners to national prominence. The Marching Southerners feature the Marching Ballerinas and the famous 20J's, named for the C.G. Conn 20J tuba that the Southerners proudly feature in its many dazzling halftime shows. The Southerners were the 2021 recipients of the Sudler Trophy, the highest award for collegiate marching bands.

Greek life

With hundreds of students, over ten percent of the undergraduate student body, JSU is home to 17 social and 22 total Greek-letter organizations. The Greek community at JSU donates over 10,000 hours and over $100,000 annually to the local community and national charities in philanthropy work. Greek students who hold executive positions within Greek Life also have a cumulative overall 3.0 GPA, ranking as one of the highest in the nation among Greek-supporting schools. In the 2017-2018 school year, every Student Government Association Executive Officer was also a member of a Greek organization along with over 60% of the SGA Student Senate. The Dean of Students Office advises and provides guidance to the fraternities and sororities associated with the three Greek Governing Councils: Interfraternity Council (IFC), the National Panhellenic Council (NPC), and the National Pan-Hellenic Council.

Chapter name, their year founded, and other information are in parentheses

Sororities
Panhellenic Council (NPC) Sororities:

Alpha Xi Delta
Zeta Tau Alpha
Phi Mu
Delta Zeta
Alpha Omicron Pi

National Pan-Hellenic Council (NPHC) Sororities:

Delta Sigma Theta
Sigma Gamma Rho
Zeta Phi Beta
Alpha Kappa Alpha

Fraternities
Interfraternity Council (IFC) Fraternities:

Pi Kappa Alpha
Delta Chi
Kappa Sigma
Pi Kappa Phi
Sigma Nu
Kappa Alpha
Alpha Tau Omega
National Pan-Hellenic Council (NPHC) Fraternities:

Kappa Alpha Psi
Omega Psi Phi
Phi Beta Sigma
Alpha Phi Alpha

Other Greek organizations

Alpha Psi Omega (national theatre honors fraternity)
Alpha Kappa Psi (international professional business fraternity)
Beta Alpha Psi (international accounting, finance and information systems honors fraternity)
Delta Omicron (international professional music honors fraternity)
Delta Sigma Pi (national business fraternity)
Gamma Sigma Sigma (women's national service sorority)
Phi Mu Alpha Sinfonia (social music fraternity)
Sigma Alpha Iota (music fraternity for women)
Sigma Alpha Omega (non-denominational Christian social sorority)
Zeta Phi Eta (national professional communication fraternity)

Notable alumni

2018 tornado 
On the evening of March 19, 2018, an EF3 tornado struck the campus of Jacksonville State University, causing minor to severe damage to every building. It was the first day of spring break for both the university and the Jacksonville City School System. Classes resumed at the university on April 9, 2018, and the spring commencement ceremony was held on May 4, 2018, as scheduled, but moved to JSU Stadium from Pete Mathews Coliseum (which was closed due to tornado damage). There were four injuries among city residents and no fatalities. More than $42 million in property damage was inflicted on the university and on April 27, 2018, President Donald Trump declared the event a federal disaster. The university continued its summer semester as planned, and President John Beehler stated all subsequent semesters will continue as normal.

Notes

References

External links
 
 
 Official athletics website

 
Jacksonville, Alabama
Public universities and colleges in Alabama
Educational institutions established in 1883
1883 establishments in Alabama
Universities and colleges accredited by the Southern Association of Colleges and Schools
Education in Calhoun County, Alabama
Buildings and structures in Calhoun County, Alabama